Virender Singh (judge) (born 7 October 1954) is an Indian Judge and  former Chief Justice of High Court of Jharkhand High Court.

Career
Singh passed from Government College, Rohtak and completed his Degree of Law from J. V. Jain College, Saharanpur. He started practice from June 1978 in Rohatak. Singh was appointed Deputy Advocate General, Haryana in 1995. On 2 July 2002 he was appointed Judge of Punjab and Haryana High Court thereafter transferred to Jammu and Kashmir High Court on 19 April 2007. He served as acting Chief Justice of Jammu and Kashmir High Court from 2 April 2012 to 8 June 2012. Justice Singh became the Chief Justice of Jharkhand High Court on 1 November 2014 and retired on 7 October 2016. After the retirement he was appointed the Chairperson of the Armed Forces Tribunal (AFT) on 3 January 2017.

References

1954 births
Living people
Indian judges
Judges of the Punjab and Haryana High Court
Judges of the Jammu and Kashmir High Court
Chief Justices of the Jharkhand High Court
21st-century Indian lawyers
21st-century Indian judges